The T43 were a class of open-ocean minesweepers built for the Soviet Navy from 1948 to 1957. It was exported to client states; the People's Republic of China and Poland produced additional ships. Some hulls were converted to other uses by various users. Examples remained in service in 2015.

Design
The hull is made of steel.

Operators

Albania received two from the Soviet Union in 1960. One retired in 2011, and the second had retired by 2015.

Algeria received two from the Soviet Union in 1968. One was cannibalized for parts by 1989. The last was retired by 2009.

Bangladesh ordered a new ship from China in 1993, based on the Chinese T43 variant, which entered service in 1996. The Tamir-II sonar was replaced by a C-Tech sonar in 1998. It was used mainly as a patrol ship. An order for three more ships was not fulfilled.

Bulgaria received three short-hulled ships from the Soviet Union in 1953. By 1989, one was cannibalized for parts and another was used as a spy ship. All were retired by 2009.

The People's Republic of China received about four short-hulled ships from the Soviet Union in the 1950s. China constructed over 60 of a variant called Type 6610 or Type 010, most of which were of the long-hull type. Production began in 1956 and continued to at least the early 1990s. Some were converted for other roles, including patrol, surveying, submarine rescue, and civilian research.

Egypt received seven ships from the Soviet Union in the 1970s. By 2015, three were in service with the remainder disposed of.

Indonesia received six ships from the Soviet Union, four in 1962 and two in 1964. None were in service by 1989.

Iraq received two ships from the Soviet Union in 1969. None were in service by 2009.

Poland built 12 ships from 1957 to 1962, including four short hulls. Of the short hulls, one was converted into a spy ship, one was retired in 1987, and another was retired in 1988. None were in service by 2009.

The Soviet Union built over 200 hulls, including those converted to other uses included diving ships, tenders, and KGB patrol ships. They were being phased out in 1989 when only 35 remained in service.

References

Sources

Mine warfare vessel classes
Minesweepers of the Soviet Navy
 
Minesweepers of the Albanian Naval Force
Minesweepers of the Algerian National Navy
Minesweepers of the Bulgarian Navy
Minesweepers of the People's Liberation Army Navy
Minesweepers of the Cuban Navy
Minesweepers of the Egyptian Navy
Minesweepers of the Indonesian Navy
Minesweepers of the Iraqi Navy
Minesweepers of the Polish Navy